Holly Hill is a historic plantation house near Aylett in King and Queen County, Virginia. It was built about 1820 and is a two-story, five-bay-by-two-bay Georgian-style brick dwelling. It has a hipped roof and four-bay rear ell.

It was listed on the National Register of Historic Places in 1973.

References

Plantation houses in Virginia
Houses on the National Register of Historic Places in Virginia
Georgian architecture in Virginia
Houses completed in 1820
Houses in King and Queen County, Virginia
National Register of Historic Places in King and Queen County, Virginia